Tarchich Mosque, is a Tunisian mosque located in the east of the medina of Tunis.
It does not exist anymore.

Localization

The mosque was located in The church's Street, the present Jemaa Ezzitouna Street.

Etymology
The word Tarchich comes from the Hebrew language word Tâarchich, one of Tunisia's old names.

References 

Mosques in Tunis